Stróże may refer to the following places in Poland:
Stróże, Kuyavian-Pomeranian Voivodeship (north-central Poland)
Stróże, Nowy Sącz County in Lesser Poland Voivodeship (south Poland)
Stróże, Tarnów County in Lesser Poland Voivodeship (south Poland)